Pieris marginalis (margined white) is a butterfly species seen across the coast of Western North America as indicated by data collected by eButterfly.

Life History Traits 
Pieris marginalis (margined white) is a canopy generalist who feeds on the plant family of Brassiceae. The species is unique as it has been seen near and away from disturbed habitat; indicating an adaptation for habitat generalization.

References

   

marginalis
Butterflies described in 1861
Butterflies of North America
Taxa named by Samuel Hubbard Scudder